Jason Preston (born August 10, 1999) is an American professional basketball player for the Los Angeles Clippers of the National Basketball Association (NBA). He played college basketball for the Ohio Bobcats.

After three seasons at Ohio, Preston was drafted 33rd overall by the Orlando Magic in the 2021 NBA draft and was traded to the Clippers. He missed his entire rookie season after undergoing surgery to address an injury in his right foot.

High school career
Preston played basketball for William R. Boone High School in Orlando, Florida, averaging two points per game over two years. He stood about 6 ft (1.83 m) and weighed 140 lbs (64 kg) out of high school and applied to the University of Central Florida as a regular student, planning to major in journalism. After competing on the Amateur Athletic Union circuit, Preston chose to play basketball at a prep school, joining Believe Prep Academy in Athens, Tennessee. He grew four inches (10 cm) and gained experience as a point guard. Preston averaged 12 points, nine assists and seven rebounds per game, leading his team to a 31–8 record. He started out playing for the B team and was elevated to the A team after a series of strong performances, but began playing for the C team after receiving little playing time. Preston eventually managed to rejoin the A team. After posting his highlights to Twitter, Preston received college basketball offers from Ohio and Longwood, eventually committing to play for Ohio.

College career
As a freshman at Ohio, Preston averaged six points, 3.6 rebounds and 3.4 assists per game, earning MAC All-Freshman Team honors. On November 13, 2019, he posted a sophomore season-high 27 points, 14 rebounds and five assists in an 81–72 win over Iona. On January 21, 2020, Preston recorded 27 points, eight assists and seven rebounds in an 83–74 loss to Toledo. On February 8, he scored 15 points, 10 rebounds and 10 assists, becoming the second player in program history to register a triple-double, in a 77–46 win over Miami (Ohio). As a sophomore, Preston averaged 16.8 points, 7.4 assists and 6.4 rebounds per game and was a Second Team All-MAC selection. He led the MAC and ranked second in the nation in assists.

On November 27, 2020, Preston recorded a career-high 31 points, eight assists and six rebounds in a 77–75 loss to eighth-ranked Illinois. His story drew national attention following the performance. On January 23, 2021, he posted his second triple-double, with 11 points, 11 assists and 10 rebounds in an 85–77 win against Ball State. Preston was named most valuable player of the MAC tournament after leading Ohio to the title. On March 20, in the first round of the NCAA tournament, he helped the 13th-seeded Bobcats to a 62–58 upset victory over fourth-seeded Virginia, recording 11 points, 13 rebounds and eight assists. As a junior, Preston averaged 15.7 points, 7.3 rebounds and 7.3 assists per game, earning First Team All-MAC honors. On April 26, 2021, he declared for the 2021 NBA draft while maintaining his college eligibility. He later decided to remain in the draft.

Professional career

Los Angeles Clippers (2021–present) 
Preston was selected with the 33rd overall pick in the 2021 NBA draft by the Orlando Magic and was then traded to the Los Angeles Clippers. On August 9, 2021, Preston signed a three-year rookie scale contract with the Clippers. On October 7, 2021, he underwent surgery after suffering an injury on his right foot during the preseason of his rookie campaign. Preston missed the entire 2021–22 season after undergoing surgery.

Preston made his NBA debut on October 23, 2022, playing three minutes in a 112–95 loss to the Phoenix Suns.

Career statistics

College

|-
| style="text-align:left;"| 2018–19
| style="text-align:left;"| Ohio
| 30 || 21 || 29.5 || .434 || .208 || .765 || 3.6 || 3.4 || .8 || .1 || 6.0
|-
| style="text-align:left;"| 2019–20
| style="text-align:left;"| Ohio
| 32 || 32 || 38.1 || .515 || .407 || .725 || 6.4 || 7.4 || 1.4 || .1 || 16.8
|-
| style="text-align:left;"| 2020–21
| style="text-align:left;"| Ohio
| 20 || 20 || 34.6 || .514 || .390 || .596 || 7.3 || 7.3 || 1.5 || .3 || 15.7
|- class="sortbottom"
| style="text-align:center;" colspan="2"| Career
| 82 || 73 || 34.1 || .498 || .357 || .703 || 5.6 || 5.9 || 1.2 || .1 || 12.6

Personal life
Preston is a Christian. Preston's mother, Judith Sewell, died of lung cancer when Preston was a junior in high school. His father was absent from his life. After his mother's death, Preston's aunt and uncle, who were living in Jamaica, became his legal guardians, though he remained in the United States and lived with the son of his mother's friend. He grew up watching the Detroit Pistons and has written about the team for online publications.

References

External links

Ohio Bobcats bio

1999 births
Living people
American men's basketball players
Basketball players from Orlando, Florida
Los Angeles Clippers players
Ohio Bobcats men's basketball players
Orlando Magic draft picks
Point guards